Mna or MNA may refer to:

 Mna, a Latin and Greek form of the Mina (unit), a unit of weight and money

Acronyms
 Ma'an News Agency, Palestinian Territories
 Magyar Nemzeti Arcvonal (Hungarian National Front)
 Mehr News Agency, Iran
 Member of the National Assembly (Quebec)
 Member of the National Assembly of Pakistan
 Merpati Nusantara Airlines, ICAO code
 Midland News Association, UK
 Minnesota Nurses Association, labor union, US
 Missouri and Northern Arkansas Railroad's reporting mark
 Mna, a village in Georgia
 Modified nodal analysis of electric circuits
 Mouvement national algérien (Algerian National Movement), 1950s
 Mouvement national de l'Azawad (National Movement for the Liberation of Azawad)
 Museo Nacional de Antropología, the national museum of anthropology, Mexico
 Muslim National Associations, a Muslim pro-Zionist organization
 Myanmar National Airlines, the national flag carrier of Myanmar
 Myanmar News Agency, the official news agency in Burma